Cardboard Citizens is the UK's only homeless people's professional theatre company, and the leading practitioner of Forum Theatre and the Theatre of the Oppressed methodology in the UK. The acclaimed theatre company works with people who have experience of homelessness or those at risk of becoming homeless to create theatre that makes a real and positive difference to society and those living in its margins.

History and productions 
Cardboard Citizens was founded in 1991 by Adrian Jackson, MBE, in the Cardboard City that had sprung up in what was then called the Bullring in Waterloo as a London Bubble project. For the first four years it toured Forum theatre by homeless people to other homeless people throughout the UK, performing in hostels, day centres, arches, the street and conference centres.

Cardboard Citizens became an independent entity in 1995 and now regularly tours acclaimed Forum Theatre productions written by playwrights including Kae Tempest (Glasshouse), Ali Taylor (Cathy) and Sarah Woods (Meta) across the UK to theatres, prisons, hostels and community venues. It has also mounted a number of critically acclaimed theatre productions in both site-specific locations and as collaborations with other larger organisations, including the Royal Shakespeare Company (RSC) and English National Opera. These have included the Evening Standard Theatre Award-winning Mincemeat, A Few Man Fridays, Pericles and Timon of Athens (both RSC). In 2016, the company staged a Community Ensemble theatrical staging of Ken Loach's Cathy Come Home to mark the film's 50th anniversary and the Theatre Company's 25th anniversary. This Event Theatre work fits with Cardboard Citizens' broader mission of using theatre to ask questions of individual, society and nation, why are things the way they are and how could they be better.

In December 2017, Cardboard Citizens' founder, CEO and Artistic Director Adrian Jackson was awarded an MBE for Services to the Arts in the 2018 New Year Honours list.

Members 
Anyone with experience of homelessness or who is vulnerable to homelessness can become a Member of Cardboard Citizens and on average Cardboard Citizens reach 1,500 homeless and at-risk people every year. The free Membership programme offers access to one to one advice, guidance and information, and enables Members to take part in Cardboard Citizens activities, learn new skills in a secure environment with its programmes of performing arts workshops at the Theatre Company's home in Whitechapel, workshops at Crisis Skylight centres and other venues across London.

Theatre of the Oppressed training 
Cardboard Citizens is one of the world's most respected Theatre of the Oppressed training organisations. It offers bespoke and off-the-shelf training in all aspects of Theatre of the Oppressed methodology: Forum Theatre, Jokering, Rainbow of Desires, Legislative Theatre and Writing for Forum.

Young people's programme 
ACT NOW is Cardboard Citizens' innovative performing arts programme for young people aged 16–25-years old who are not in education employment or training (NEET), or have experience of homelessness. The free programme gives young people the opportunity to work with a professional artistic team to learn theatre skills including acting, directing, devising, script writing and more in a relaxed, welcoming and friendly environment. ACT Now offers regular drama and music workshops that aim to build participants' confidence and social skills, all of which are free and open access. Members can also gain Arts Award and PEARL qualifications alongside performance projects.

Creative residencies 
As part of its work with homeless and at-risk communities, Cardboard Citizens offer intensive month-long participatory programmes and training, engaging homeless and vulnerable communities outside London, and training local housing association, social sector staff and local artists in the art of Forum Theatre. The programmes give communities the chance to raise awareness of the issues they face using Forum Theatre to share stories and issues.

Ambassador 
Kate Winslet has been the Ambassador for Cardboard Citizens since 2007. On Cardboard Citizens' website, Winslet is quoted as saying: "Whether the audience are homeless or not, what has always struck me is the level of engagement or debate that Cardboard Citizens' work stimulates as well as the profound impact it has on participants and spectators alike."

Actors David Morrissey and Rory Kinnear joined the organisation as Ambassadors in 2017.

See also
 Theatre of the Oppressed
 Adrian Jackson (Cardboard Citizens)
 Augusto Boal

References

External links
 Cardboard Citizens website
 The Guardian review of Cathy Come Home at the Barbican
 Article by Adrian Jackson on working with actors with experience of homelessness
 Article by Adrian Jackson on creating Mincemeat
 Kate Tempest on Glasshouse

Theatre of the Oppressed
Theatre companies in England